12 Songs of Christmas is a 1964 album of Christmas music by Frank Sinatra, Bing Crosby, and Fred Waring's Pennsylvanians. The singers previously collaborated on the album America, I Hear You Singing, which was released earlier the same year. The album was reissued as White Christmas on by WEA budget label Midi in 1973.

Reprise Records included the entire album in their Frank Sinatra CD "Nothing but the Best" Christmas edition which was released in 2008.

Reception

In the US, Variety received the album favorably. "This is an attractive compilation of seasonal standards delivered in standout style by Bing Crosby and Frank Sinatra, singly and in tandem, with the polished support of Fred Waring's Pennsylvanians. Among the top sides in this set are "Go Tell It on the Mountain," "The Little Drummer Boy," "I Heard the Bells on Christmas Day" and "The 12 Days of Christmas."
 
Gramophone in the UK was not so keen, commenting: "'12 Songs of Christmas,' with Bing Crosby, Frank Sinatra and Fred Waring and the Pennsylvanians (Reprise FS 2022). Plenty of expensive talent crammed uncomfortably into a small, well-worn stocking. Obvious, pallid stuff, with the two head groaners actually together on only two tracks, and neither of them anywhere in particularly good voice. Collectors of sheer corn may take a perverse delight in an item called 'We Wish You the Merriest.'"

Track listing

Personnel
 Fred Waring and the Pennsylvanians (Tracks 1, 5, 8, 10)
 Bing Crosby and Fred Waring (Tracks 2, 9, 11)
 Bing Crosby, Frank Sinatra and Fred Waring (Track 3, 12)
 Frank Sinatra and Fred Waring (Track 4, 6, 7)

References

Pop Christmas albums
1964 Christmas albums
Albums produced by Sonny Burke
Bing Crosby albums
Christmas albums by American artists
Frank Sinatra albums
Fred Waring albums
Reprise Records albums
Split albums